Drosera quartzicola is a species in the carnivorous plant genus Drosera and is endemic to the Serra do Cipó in central Minas Gerais state in southeastern Brazil. It is found growing in campo rupestre vegetation along with D. tentaculata and D. chrysolepis. It is typically found growing in silica sands surrounded by white quartz gravel, which is the origin of the specific epithet quartzicola. Drosera quartzicola grows in drier habitats than other Drosera species and flowers earlier in the wet season from January to February. It superficially resembles D. schwackei, but it is more closely related to D. camporupestris, D. graminifolia, and D. chrysolepis.

Of the Drosera found in Brazil, D. quartzicola is the rarest, consisting of only four known populations of about 300 individual plants as of its description in 2011. Some of the small populations are also in areas of occasional to frequent disturbance by humans and cattle. Because of these factors, the authors proposed listing this new species as critically endangered under the International Union for Conservation of Nature (IUCN).

Drosera quartzicola was first collected in the early 1990s and deposited as an herbarium specimen at the Universidade de São Paulo Herbarium, but it was not immediately recognized as a new species. Rivadavia and Gonella made the rediscovery of the new taxon in 1996 but did not formally publish their findings until 2011 in the journal Phytotaxa.

See also 
List of Drosera species
Taxonomy of Drosera

References 

quartzicola
Endemic flora of Brazil
Flora of Minas Gerais
Carnivorous plants of South America
Plants described in 2011